Icon is an album released on March 1, 2011, from country music singer Billy Ray Cyrus. The album was released via Universal Music Group Nashville's Mercury Nashville division. The album features 12 songs that were featured on Cyrus' first three studio albums.

Reception

Critical
Thom Jurek of Allmusic gave the album a "3-star rating". He noted the fact that the compilation only features songs from Cyrus' first three albums, as well as picking successful songs from his debut album, Some Gave All.

Track listing

References

2011 albums
Billy Ray Cyrus albums
Mercury Records albums